Skylab One may refer to:

 Skylab I, the first generation of U.S. space stations
 Skylab 1 (SL-1), the first Skylab mission
 Skylab 2 (SLM-1), the first crewed mission to Skylab
 Skylab (album), an album by Rogério Skylab, AKA "Skylab I"

See also
 Skylab (disambiguation)